is a Japanese voice actor from Chiba Prefecture. He is currently affiliated with Rimax.

Filmography

Television animation 
 2003: Ghost in the Shell: Stand Alone Complex as Tsujisaki Yū, Hotel man
 2004: Futakoi as Yūya Hiyama
 2004: Pokémon Advanced Generation as Jimmy
 2004: Uninhabited Planet Survive! (Louis)
 2005: Yakitate!! Japan (Main doctor, Kaname Hiroshi)
 2005: Black Jack as Largo
 2006: Pururun! Shizuku-Chan as Namida-kun
 2007: Ōkiku Furikabutte as Kyōhei Akimaru
 2008: True Tears as Shinichirō Nakagami
 2009: Shangri-La as Kunihito Kusanagi
 2009: Guin Saga as Asturias
 2010-2013: Pocket Monsters: Best Wishes as Cress (2 seasons)
 2011: Mirai Nikki as Masumi Nishijima
 2016: JoJo's Bizarre Adventure: Diamond Is Unbreakable as Masami Oto, Cheap Trick
 2016: Maho Girls PreCure! as François (ep. 38 onwards)
 2018: Nil Admirari no Tenbin: Teito Genwaku Kitan as Tōichiro Sasagoi
 2019-2021: Fafner in the Azure as Kazuki Makabe
 2019-2022:  Arifureta: From Commonplace to World's Strongest 2nd Season as Mikhail

Video games 
 2006: Crash Boom Bang! as Crash Bandicoot, Fake Crash
 2008: Tales of Vesperia as Rapende
 2009: Tears to Tiara as Arthur
 2013: Super Robot Wars UX as Kazuki Makabe
 2016: Honkai Impact 3rd - A Post Honkai Odyssey as Main Character
 2017: Another Eden as Seven, Benedict

Dubbing

References

External links 
 Official agency profile 
 

1976 births
Living people
Male voice actors from Chiba Prefecture
Japanese male video game actors
Japanese male voice actors
21st-century Japanese male actors